Doris Armgart "Dodo" Große (born 5 June 1884 in Dürrröhrsdorf near Dresden, Germany; date of death unknown) was a German artists' model and the lover of Ernst Ludwig Kirchner (1880–1938), a German expressionist painter and printmaker and one of the founders of the artists' group Die Brücke.

Life 

Doris Große was the ninth of eleven children born to caterer Friedrich August Grosse (d. 1894) and his wife Juliane Ernestine, née Krahl (d. 1902). Some years after her father's death, around 1901, Doris moved with her mother to Dresden. After her mother's death the following year, she continued to live in Dresden with her sisters Frieda Paula and Juliette Armgart, working as a shop assistant. In 1903 or 1904, she first met the artist Ernst Ludwig Kirchner, and soon became his lover and favoured model, a relationship that continued until shortly before Kirchner left for Berlin in 1911. During this time, Kirchner bestowed on her the pet name that she was to be best known by, "Dodo".

After Kirchner's departure from Berlin, little is known of Doris and her sisters until 1935–1937, when they were registered as living in Dresden. At the time, Doris was registered in the Dresden directory as a milliner. They both moved in 1936, and Doris is known to have taken early retirement in 1937. There is no record of her death.

Gallery

References

1884 births
German artists' models
Year of death missing